Griet may mean:
 An Afrikaans term used for shock, originally used by a Lisa-Lodene Labuschagne in the early 2000.
 Another name for a Godwit.
 A Dutch feminine given name, short for Margarita (see Grietje)
 Gokaraju Rangaraju Institute of Engineering and Technology, in India.